The tenth season of Akademi Fantasia, also branded as AF2013, premiered on 14 September 2013 and concluded on 17 November 2013 on the Astro Ria television channel. The season introduced Zizan Razak as host along with the new judging panel, Edry Abdul Halim, Sharifah Amani and Roslan Aziz.

This season is used a new format and different from previous seasons of Akademi Fantasia, this season is searching a new singing talent, both solo and duo, in Malaysia. Apart from that, this season are open to Singaporean. Unlike previous season which used Principle as head trainers, this season have  "Inspirer", which include Faizal Tahir (Week 1-3), Melly Goeslaw (Week 4-6) and Siti Nurhaliza (Week 7-10). 

On 17 November 2013, Mohd Faizul Sany from Tawau, Sabah was announced as the season's winner and male duo, Azhael was the runner-up.

Auditions

Auditions were held in the following cities:

The Zon Hotel, Johor Bahru - 1 & 2 June 2013
Vistana Hotel, Penang - 8 & 9 June 2013
Merdeka Palace Hotel, Kuching, Sarawak - 15 & 16 June 2013
Promenade Hotel, Kota Kinabalu, Sabah - 22 & 23 June 2013
SACC, Shah Alam, Selangor - 29 & 30 June 2013

-Candidates are free to sing any genre of song.
-Participants also can submit their entries online by submit the link of their video (which has been uploaded into YouTube) via AF2013's Official Website. 
-Contestants were required to be between the ages of 18 to 35, and are Malaysian and Singaporean citizens.

Students
(ages stated are at time of contest)

Concert Summaries

Week 1
Theme: 15 Malaysian Icon
Original Airdate: 14 September 2013

 Eliminated: Sani

Week 2
Theme: 15 Malaysian Icon
Original Airdate: 21 September 2013

 Eliminated: Darren

Week 3
Original Airdate: 29 September 2013

 Eliminated: Iman

Week 4
Original Airdate: 6 October 2013

 Eliminated: Nona

Week 5
Original Airdate: 13 October 2013

 No Elimination

Week 6
Original Airdate: 20 October 2013

 Eliminated: Irmisa

Week 7
Theme: Duet
Original Airdate: 27 October 2013

 Eliminated: Suhada

Week 8
Original Airdate: 2 November 2013

First Round

Second Round

Battle Round

 No elimination

Week 9
Theme: Solo & Rock
Original Airdate: 10 November 2013

 Eliminated: Azhael

Week 10 (Final) 
Original Airdate: 17 November 2013

Azhael was re-entered into the competition after scoring the highest votes through AFMASUK.

Elimination chart

Cast members

Hosts
 Zizan Razak - Host of concert of Akademi Fantasia 
  Hefny Sahad - Diari Akademi Fantasia 
  Hanis Zalikha - TGI AF & AF Buzz

Professional trainers
 Faizal Tahir, Melly Goeslow, & Siti Nurhaliza - Inspirer
 Shafizawati Sharif - Vocal Presentation
 Alam Wakaka & Suhaili- Choreographer
 Fizz Fairuz - Drama & Acting

Judges
 Edry Abdul Halim
 Sharifah Amani
 Roslan Aziz

Season statistics
Total number of students: 12 (14)
Oldest student: Faizul Sany, 28 years old
Youngest students: Rasmawatie Mohd Thamrin, 18 years old

References

External links
 Official Site
 

2013 Malaysian television seasons
Akademi Fantasia seasons